Aretsou is an under-construction metro station serving Thessaloniki Metro's Line 2. The station gets its name from the neighbourhood it is in, Nea Aretsou, which in turn is named after the ancient Greek colony of Arethousa, modern-day Darıca. It is expected to enter service in 2023.

References

See also
List of Thessaloniki Metro stations

Thessaloniki Metro